Felix Ley (March 5, 1909 - January 23, 1972), Order of Friars Minor Capuchin, was an American prelate of the Roman Catholic Church who served as bishop and the apostolic administrator of Okinawa and the Southern Islands/Ryukyus, now the Diocese of Naha, in Naha, Japan.

Biography
Alvin Ley was born in Hewitt, Wood County, Wisconsin United States and was ordained to the Roman Catholic priesthood on June 14, 1936.

Father Ley was sent to Guam, where he was taken prisoner by the Japanese army during World War II. He was held prisoner of war at Kobe, Japan.   After World War II, he was sent to Okinawa.

On March 11, 1968, Pope Paul VI appointed Felix Ley the apostolic administrator of the Okinawa and the Southern Islands/Ryukyus, and he was consecrated bishop on June 9, 1968.

Bishop Ley died in Naha.

See also

Notes

1909 births
1972 deaths
American expatriate bishops
Capuchin bishops
People from Wood County, Wisconsin
People from Okinawa Prefecture
Religious leaders from Wisconsin
Roman Catholic Diocese of La Crosse
Catholics from Wisconsin
20th-century Roman Catholic bishops in Japan